An estrogen synthesis inhibitor is a type of drug which inhibits the enzymatic synthesis of estrogens, such as estradiol. They include:

 Aromatase inhibitors (CYP19A1 inhibitors): inhibit the synthesis of estrogens from androgens
 CYP17A1 inhibitors (17α-hydroxylase/17,20-lyase inhibitors): inhibit the synthesis of androgens and therefore estrogens
 3β-Hydroxysteroid dehydrogenase inhibitors (3β-HSD inhibitors): inhibit the synthesis of progestogens and of more-potent androgens, thereby inhibiting the synthesis of estrogens
 Cholesterol side-chain cleavage enzyme inhibitors (P450SCC/CYP11A1 inhibitors): inhibit the synthesis of pregnenolone from cholesterol, thereby inhibiting the synthesis of most steroid hormones (which are derived from pregnenolone) including estrogens
 17β-Hydroxysteroid dehydrogenase inhibitors (17β-HSD inhibitors): inhibit the interconversion of estrogens, including the synthesis of estradiol from the less-potent estrone
 Steroid sulfatase inhibitors (STS inhibitors): inhibit the conversion of inactive estrogen sulfates into active estrogens like estradiol

Inhibitors of cholesterol synthesis can also reduce estrogen production by inhibiting cholesterol production.

Estrogen synthesis inhibitors have medical applications in the treatment of breast cancer, precocious puberty, gynecomastia, and hyperestrogenism, among other estrogen-dependent conditions.

See also
 Steroidogenesis inhibitor
 Androgen synthesis inhibitor
 Progesterone synthesis inhibitor

References

Steroidogenesis inhibitors